Dimargaritales is a monotypic order of fungi in the monotypic Dimargaritomycetes class within the
subdivision of Kickxellomycotina.

Dimargaritales was published in 1979, while Dimargaritomycetes was published by Tedersoo et al. in Fungal Diversity vol.90, Issue 1 on page 151 in 2018.

It is parasitic. But can grow solitary on agar media, thus cold facultative parasite.

Only one family, Dimargaritaceae, exists, containing three genera:
Dimargaritaceae
Dimargaris - 7 spp.
Dispira - 4 spp.
Tieghemiomyces - 2 spp.

Dimargaritales incertae sedis
Spinalia

References

Zygomycota
Fungus orders